Raccolto is an album by Italian pianist Stefano Battaglia recorded in 2003 and released on the ECM label.

Reception
The Allmusic review by Thom Jurek awarded the album 4 stars stating "Milanese pianist and composer Stefano Battaglia has walked on both sides of the classical and jazz street with ease and comfort... he performs in two different settings to illustrate his tremendous gifts as both an improviser and a composer... Disc one showcases Battaglia in a jazz trio setting... Here, lush lyricism folds into free improvisation... The second disc in this collection features Rabbia and Battaglia with violinist Dominique Pifarély, a member of Louis Sclavis' group. These 12 tunes are full of bracing improvisations and textural tension... The two discs together are all but irresistible to fans of the new European music".

Track listing
Disc One:
All compositions by Stefano Battaglia except as indicated
 "Raccolto" – 5:43 
 "Triangolazioni" – 14:42 
 "Triosonic I" (Stefano Battaglia, Giovanni Maier, Michele Rabbia) – 3:47 
 "All Is Language" (Battaglia, Maier, Rabbia) – 11:01 
 "Our Circular Song" (Battaglia, Maier, Rabbia) – 4:25 
 "Coro" – 4:24 
 "Trisonic II" (Battaglia, Maier, Rabbia) – 1:22 
 "In Front of the Fourth Door" (Battaglia, Maier, Rabbia) – 4:33 
 "L 'Osservanza" – 4:21 
Disc Two:
All compositions by Stefano Battaglia, Dominique Pifarély and Michele Rabbia except as indicated
 "Lys" – 5:02 
 "Canto I (Dell'agonia Della Terra)" – 4:11 
 "Riconoscenza" – 4:05 
 "Réminiscence pour Violon et Piano" (Battaglia, Pifarély) – 4:09 
 "Pourquoi?" – 3:47 
 "Il Circo Ungherese" – 3:27 
 "Veritas" – 1:55 
 "Velario de Marzo" (Battaglia, Pifarély) – 5:04 
 "Recitativo in Memoria di Luciano Berio" – 5:40 
 "Canto II (Dell'agonia Dei Cieli)" – 3:01 
 "Trois Brouillons" – 6:02 
 "...Dulci Declinant Lumina Somno..." – 3:53 
Recorded at Artesuono Recording Studio in Udine, Italy in September and December 2003

Personnel
 Stefano Battaglia — piano
 Dominique Pifarély — violin (Disc Two) 
 Giovanni Maier — double bass (Disc One) 
 Michele Rabbia — percussion

References

ECM Records albums
Stefano Battaglia albums
2005 albums
Albums produced by Manfred Eicher